Mississippi Tennessee Railroad or Mississippi & Tennessee Railroad may refer to:

Ripley and New Albany Railroad
Mississippi and Tennessee Railroad on "Grenada District"

Railway companies of the United States